Schönbächler is a Swiss surname. Notable people with the surname include:

 Andreas Schönbächler (born 1966), Swiss freestyle skier
 Marco Schönbächler (born 1990), Swiss football player
 Kip Schönbächler (born 1992), Swiss football player

Swiss-German surnames